Green Creek Township is one of the twelve townships of Sandusky County, Ohio, United States.  As of the 2000 census, 9,527 people lived in the township, 3,467 of whom lived in the unincorporated portions of the township.

Geography
Located in the southeastern part of the county, it borders the following townships:
Riley Township - north
Townsend Township - northeast corner
York Township - east
Thompson Township, Seneca County - southeast corner
Adams Township, Seneca County - southeast
Pleasant Township, Seneca County - southwest corner
Ballville Township - west
Sandusky Township - northwest corner

Most of the city of Clyde is located in eastern Green Creek Township, and part of the village of Green Springs lies in the township's southwest.

Name and history
Green Creek Township was established in 1822. Named after Green Creek, the largest stream which runs through the area, it is the only Green Creek Township statewide.

Government
The township is governed by a three-member board of trustees, who are elected in November of odd-numbered years to a four-year term beginning on the following January 1. Two are elected in the year after the presidential election and one is elected in the year before it. There is also an elected township fiscal officer, who serves a four-year term beginning on April 1 of the year after the election, which is held in November of the year before the presidential election. Vacancies in the fiscal officership or on the board of trustees are filled by the remaining trustees.

Township officials

References

External links
Township website
County website

Townships in Sandusky County, Ohio
Townships in Ohio